Juan de García y Montenegro was Bishop of Urgell and ex officio Co-Prince of Andorra from 1780 to 1783.

18th-century Princes of Andorra
Bishops of Urgell
18th-century Roman Catholic bishops in Spain